Marc Hendrickx (born 8 August 1968 in Mechelen) is a Flemish politician and is affiliated to the N-VA. He is a municipal councillor of Mechelen since 2001. He was elected as a member of the Flemish Parliament in 2009.

Since 2010 he is an alternate member of the European Alliance 
group at the European Committee of the Regions.

Notes

1968 births
Living people
Members of the Flemish Parliament
New Flemish Alliance politicians
Politicians from Mechelen
21st-century Belgian politicians